The Hong Kong national rugby league team represents Hong Kong in the sport of rugby league.

History
The Hong Kong Rugby League (HKRL) was formed in December 2014, with the first official rugby league matches in Hong Kong being played in 2015 and the inaugural Hong Kong Super League being contested in 2017.

Hong Kong made its Test debut in November 2017, losing to Japan in Kowloon. Hong Kong plays Japan for a trophy called the East Asia Cup.

Hong Kong was included in the RLIF world rankings for the first time in December 2017. Hong Kong is currently ranked 45th in the world.

Ben Ryan scored the first try for Hong Kong during their debut international against Japan. He also told fellow international Rugby League player Latrel Mitchell about it in Port Macquarie.

Current squad
Squad selected for 2018 Emerging Nations World Championship;
Matthew Waugh
Mike Tsang
Rhys Johnson
Richard Lindsay
Ben Wong
John Howarth
Gus Spence
Lee Griffiths
Craig McMurrich
Gareth Janes
Benoit Mouclier
Alex Shvets
Ari Rogers
Toby Lei
Ben Ryan
Hung Yip
Ringo Lung
Allan Newsome
Jack Nielsen

Hong Kong Residents XIII 
The Hong Kong Residents XIII was a representative team made by the Hong Kong Rugby League to give open-age players who currently reside in Hong Kong the opportunity to help develop Rugby League throughout Asia.  Whilst not the International Representative team of Hong Kong, the Residents team gave an opportunity for a number of players in the Thunder to develop.

The Residents have had three tours since their formation in 2015, touring the Philippines twice, and Thailand once.

2017 

Hong Kong Residents 58 defeated Philippines Admirals 8 (John Franklin Agunod, Jay Caña tries) at Emperor Stadium, Taguig, Philippines (18 March 2017)

2016 

Hong Kong Residents 20 (Rob Hotchin 2, Doug Fluker, Hugh Quinivan tries; Doug Fluker 2 from 4 goals) defeated Thailand Residents 16 (Sakul Chopaka, Richard Chigumba, Julien Domenech tries; Ben Geldart 2 from 3 goals) at Horseshoe Point Resort, Pattaya, Thailand (28 May 2016)

2015 

Hong Kong Residents 40 (Tom Patridge 2, Kurt O'Brien 2, Doug Fluker, Tom Beresford, Yosuke Yamagishi tries; Doug Fluker 6 from 6 goals) defeated Manila Storm 34 (Elvis William Jensen 2, Martin Yam 2, Greg Ranza, Benny Noki tries; Martin Yami 5 from 6 goals) at Southern Plains Field in Alabang, Philippines (7 November 2015)

International Results
International results for the Hong Kong Thunder.

2018 
Hong Kong 32 defeated Japan Samurais 20 at Sogo Ground of Inagi Chuo Park, Tokyo, 16 June 2018.

Poland 62 (S Maslanka 2, R Mykietyn 2, C Korostchuk 3, J Metuangaro 2, E Niszczot, M Maslanka 2 tries; E Niszczot 7 goals)  v 6 Hong Kong (C McMurrich try; R Lindsay 1 goal) at St Marys Leagues Stadium, Sydney, 4 October 2018. 2018 Emerging Nations World Championship. C McMurrich sin binned twice.

Solomon Islands 32  (L Tongaka, T Sanga, S Momoa, M Singamoana 2, H Angikimua, D Saomatangi tries; E Moeava  2 goals) v 12 Hong Kong (L Griffiths, M Waugh tries; R Lindsay 2 goals) at Kellyville Ridge Stadium, Sydney, 7 October 2018. 2018 Emerging Nations World Championship. L Griffiths and M Singamoana sin binned.

Japan 32 (K Fukushige, F Karino, I Matsuo, E Shivasaki 2, G Gerediaga tries; T Sugano 4 goals) v 30 Hong Kong (R Lindsay, L Griffiths, B Ryan, C McMurrich, G Spence tries; R Lindsay 5 goals) at Windsor Sports Complex, Sydney, 11 October 2018. 2018 Emerging Nations World Championship.

Solomon Islands 56 (Singamoana, Angikumua 3, Moe'ava 2, Sanga, Tengemoana, Manau, 2, Saomatangi tries; E Moe'ava 5, T Sanga 1 goals) v 14 Hong Kong (B Barnes, R Lindsay, C McMurrich tries; B Barnes 1 goal) at St Marys Leagues Stadium field number 2, Sydney, 13 October 2018. 2018 Emerging Nations World Championship. C McMurrich sin binned.

2017 

Hong Kong 22 (Ben Ryan 2, Gus Spence, Toby Lei tries; Kin Chong 3 from 4 goals) lost to Japan Samurais 24 (Kazuki Fukushige, Itaru Matuso, Kenshin Tsutsui, Kohei Ishikawa, Royoji Kitabayashi tries, Dai Fujitaka 2 from 5 goals) at King's Park in Kowloon, 4 November 2017.

Fixtures 
Upcoming fixtures for the Hong Kong Thunder

2018 

Emerging Nations World Championship - Sydney, Australia (September - October 2018)

References

R
National rugby league teams
Rugby league in Hong Kong